The Aztec Ruins National Monument in northwestern New Mexico, USA, consists of preserved structures constructed by the Pueblo Indians. Archaeological evidence puts the construction of the ruins in the 12th and 13th centuries. The Puebloan-built ruins were dubbed the "Aztec Ruins" by 19th century American settlers who misattributed their construction to the Aztecs.

The site was declared "Aztec Ruin National Monument" on January 24, 1923. "Ruin" was changed to "Ruins" after a boundary change, on July 2, 1928. As a historical property of the National Park Service, the monument was administratively listed on the National Register of Historic Places on October 15, 1966. The United Nations Educational, Scientific and Cultural Organization
(UNESCO) listed the Chaco Culture as a World Heritage Site on December 8, 1987. That listing specifically included the Aztec Ruins.

The monument is on the Trail of the Ancients Scenic Byway, one of New Mexico's Scenic Byways.

The property was part of a 160-acre (65 ha) homestead owned by H.D. Abrams, who supported the preservation of the ruins. The H.D. Abrams House in Aztec is listed on the National Register of Historic Places.

See also
National Register of Historic Places listings in San Juan County, New Mexico
List of National Monuments of the United States
List of the oldest buildings in New Mexico

References

External links
 "The National Parks: Index 2001–2003". Washington, D. C., United States Department of the Interior
 National Park Service website
 American Southwest, a National Park Service Discover Our Shared Heritage Travel Itinerary
 UNESCO World Heritage site
 
 

1923 establishments in New Mexico
Ancestral Puebloans
Archaeological museums in New Mexico
Archaeological sites on the National Register of Historic Places in New Mexico
Former populated places in New Mexico
History of San Juan County, New Mexico
Museums in San Juan County, New Mexico
National Register of Historic Places in San Juan County, New Mexico
Native American history of New Mexico
Native American museums in New Mexico
National Park Service National Monuments in New Mexico
Open-air museums in New Mexico
Protected areas established in 1923
Protected areas of San Juan County, New Mexico
Pueblo great houses
Ruins in the United States
World Heritage Sites in the United States
Pueblos on the National Register of Historic Places in New Mexico
Populated places on the National Register of Historic Places in New Mexico